"Harder Than You Think" is the first single from Public Enemy's 20th anniversary album How You Sell Soul to a Soulless People Who Sold Their Soul? released in 2007. It was produced by Gary G-Wiz.

The song attained popularity during late summer 2007, and became Public Enemy's highest-charting single on the UK Singles Chart in August 2012. The track borrows from Shirley Bassey's 1972 track "Jezahel", a cover of the song "Jesahel" by the Italian prog rock band Delirium.

Music video 
The music video was directed by David C. Snyder, and was uploaded unofficially onto YouTube on  August 3, 2007.

Following the use of "Harder Than You Think" to soundtrack the UK's Channel 4 coverage of the Summer 2012 Paralympics, a music video including clips from the Channel 4 trailer for the Summer 2012 Paralympics was produced by HWIC Filmworks (founded by John Delserone and David C. Snyder, who directed the original video).

A version of the video was also produced for the Dehasse Radio Edit, a dance version of the track remixed for the 2012 re-emergence of the track in the UK charts.

Use in media 
The song was featured in Eric Koston's segment in the 2007 skateboarding video "Fully Flared". The song and its beat were used by ESPN for the 2011 Big East men's basketball tournament. The song is also featured on the soundtrack of the video game Skate 2. The song was later featured heavily in a Fall K-Mart ad as of September 2011. It is also one of the lead songs in the commercials for ESPN's broadcasting of the Winter X Games.  The song featured prominently towards the end of the BBC Four 2011 documentary "Public Enemy: Prophets Of Rage" which was screened as the fourth episode of the channel's "Black Music Legends Of The 1980s" series.  It also appeared in the trailer for the 2012 film Something from Nothing: The Art of Rap and was also the only track to feature on its soundtrack album which did not appear in the actual film.  The song is also featured at the opening of the 2012 film End of Watch. In 2021 it's been used in the NBA commercial about Martin Luther King, Jr Day called "We Must Learn". It is also featured in The Redeem Team documentary film released by Netflix in 2022.

Paralympics 
In the United Kingdom, it was used as the soundtrack in both the 90-second long trailer and as the theme tune to Channel 4's coverage of the 2012 Summer Paralympics. The song subsequently experienced a surge in sales, peaking at number 4 and thereby becoming Public Enemy's first Top 10 single in the UK and their highest-charting single ever in the nation.  A review for The Independent said of its re-release in the UK: "Following its prominent use in Channel 4's Paralympics coverage, great lost 2007 single 'Harder Than You Think' had a sales surge that carried it into the UK Top Five, giving the band their biggest hit to date. It'd be a thrilling piece of work in any era, Chuck delivering a typically apocalyptic call to arms over a backing track which uses a horn sample from Shirley Bassey's 'Jezahel', but to hear it blasting from the radio in the second decade of this century is beyond beautiful." The song also serves as the theme tune to the British TV show The Last Leg, which was originally a show that ran alongside the 2012 Paralympics, but later spun off as an independent show.

The song was also used as the theme tune to Channel 4's coverage of the 2014 Winter Paralympics in Sochi, Russia; the 2016 Summer Paralympics in Rio de Janeiro, Brazil; the 2018 Winter Paralympics in Pyeongchang, South Korea and the 2020 Summer Paralympics in Tokyo, Japan.

Track listing

12" vinyl
Side A
"Harder Than You Think" (Clean Mix)
"Harder Than You Think" (Instrumental)
Side B
"Amerikan Gangster" (Dirty Mix)
"Amerikan Gangster" (Clean Mix)
"Amerikan Gangster" (Instrumental)

2012 digital download
"Harder Than You Think" (UK Radio Edit) - 3:10

Other versions
"Harder Than You Think" (Album Version) - 4:10
"Harder Than You Think" (Remix) - 4:38
Harder Than You Think (Dehasse Radio Edit) - 3:18
Harder Than You Think (Dehasse Club Mix) - 5:59

Chart performance

Certifications

Release history

References

External links 
 "Harder Than You Think" video
 Channel 4 90 second trailer for Summer 2012 Paralympics using "Harder Than You Think"
 "Harder Than You Think" video released following its use for the Paralympics
 "We Must Learn" video for 2021 NBA MLK Day celebration

2007 singles
Public Enemy (band) songs
2012 singles
Songs written by Chuck D
Songs written by Flavor Flav
Songs written by Gary G-Wiz
2007 songs
Sports television theme songs